Mattia Bais (born 19 October 1996) is an Italian cyclist, who currently rides for UCI ProTeam . In October 2020, he was named in the startlist for the 2020 Giro d'Italia.

Major results

2014
 9th G.P. Sportivi Sovilla
2016
 10th Gran Premio Sportivi di Poggiana
2017
 4th GP Kranj
 5th Raiffeisen Grand Prix
 6th Croatia–Slovenia
2018
 5th Overall Tour of Romania
 6th Overall Carpathian Couriers Race
1st Stage 6
 7th Trofeo Città di San Vendemiano
 10th GP Kranj
2019
 2nd Overall Giro della Friuli Venezia Giulia
1st Mountains classification
 6th Overall Tour of Bihor
 8th Overall Sibiu Cycling Tour
2021
 9th Trofeo Matteotti
 10th Memorial Marco Pantani
 10th Coppa Ugo Agostoni
2022
 10th Overall Circuit de la Sarthe

Grand Tour general classification results timeline

References

External links
 
 

1996 births
Living people
Italian male cyclists
People from Rovereto
Cyclists from Trentino-Alto Adige/Südtirol
Sportspeople from Trentino
21st-century Italian people